Sülüktü Botanical Reserve is a reserve located in Leylek District of Batken Region of Kyrgyzstan. It was established in 1975 to protect endemics tulips (Tulipa rosea Vved. and Tulipa kolpakowskiana Regel). The reserve occupies 30 hectares.

References
 

Botanical reserves in Kyrgyzstan
Protected areas established in 1975